Gunjik (also known as Gonjīk) is a village in Goyjah Bel Rural District of the Central District of Ahar County, East Azerbaijan province, Iran. At the 2006 census, its population was 751 in 152 households. The following census in 2011 counted 679 people in 175 households. The latest census in 2016 showed a population of 686 people in 206 households; it was the largest village in its rural district.

References 

Ahar County

Populated places in East Azerbaijan Province

Populated places in Ahar County